Loosehead prop is the positioning of a player in the scrums of both rugby football sports:

 Prop forward the left- in rugby league football
 Loosehead prop (rugby union) in rugby union football